Louise Island is a  island in Haida Gwaii, in British Columbia, Canada, off the east coast of Moresby Island. It was named for Princess Louise, Duchess of Argyll, fourth daughter of Queen Victoria.  Louise Island is located east of Moresby Island and Carmichael Passage, and south of Cumshewa Inlet.

The island is home to the ancient Haida village of Skedans.  Beatty Anchorage, a logging camp, is also on the island.

Two officially named mountains on the island are Mount Kermode and Mount Carl.

See also 
 List of islands of British Columbia

References

External links
 Louise Island at britishcolumbia.com

Haida
Islands of Haida Gwaii